is an NHK television program in Japan, broadcast since 2011.

Concept 

The concept of the program is to shed light on a masterpiece of literature from all over the world, from classic to contemporary literature. The program invites an expert as the pundit who is best known for the selected masterpiece, in terms of both of the prominent knowledge of (and research on) the title and the excellence in presentation skills to the broad audiences comprehensibly. The pundit explains the profound world of the title concisely, but insightfully and enjoyable. 100 Pun (100 minutes) means the one title will be explained in 25 minutes per week, in a month (4 weeks × 25 minutes = 100 minutes). In the last week, the program will invite another guest commentator and have discussion sessions with the personalities and the pundit (not all the time).

Broadcast 
(2018-) 
Monday 22:25 - 22:50 
Wednesday 5:30 - 5:55、12:00 - 12:25

Personalities 
(2018-) 
・Hikaru Ijūin
・

Narrators 
In the program, the renowned professional narrators read the major lines of the work.

.

Program

Regular series

Special series

Single

Awards
Galaxy Award, January, 2016
Hoso Bunka Foundation Awards, January, 2016

External links 
 https://www.nhk-ondemand.jp/share/pr/meicho.html (Japanese)

Footnote 

NHK original programming